John Gilbert is a former professional rugby league footballer who played in the 1970s and 1980s.

Playing career

Gilbert made his début for Featherstone Rovers on Sunday 2 January 1977, during his time at Featherstone Rovers he scored sixty-seven 3-point tries, and thirteen 4-point tries.

Challenge Cup Final appearances
Gilbert played left-, i.e. number 4, (replaced by interchange/substitute, i.e. number 14, Paul Lyman, following an illegal high-tackle by Paul Rose who received a 10-minute sin-bin) in Featherstone Rovers' 14-12 victory over Hull F.C. in the 1983 Challenge Cup Final during the 1982–83 season at Wembley Stadium, London on Saturday 7 May 1983, in front of a crowd of 84,969.

County Cup Final appearances
Gilbert played right-, i.e. number 3, in Featherstone Rovers' 7-17 defeat by Castleford in the 1977 Yorkshire County Cup Final during the 1977–78 season at Headingley Rugby Stadium, Leeds on Saturday 15 October 1977.

References

External links
Statistics at rugbyleagueproject.org
The Story of Wembley 1983. Part I - a featherstone rovers blog
The Story of Wembley 1983. Part II - a featherstone rovers blog
The Story of Wembley 1983. Part III - a featherstone rovers blog
The Story of Wembley 1983. Part IV - a featherstone rovers blog
The Story of Wembley 1983. Part V - a featherstone rovers blog
The Story of Wembley 1983. Part VI - a featherstone rovers blog
The Story of Wembley 1983. Part VII - a featherstone rovers blog
The Story of Wembley 1983. Part VIII - a featherstone rovers blog
The Story of Wembley 1983. Part IX - a featherstone rovers blog
The Story of Wembley 1983. Part X - a featherstone rovers blog

Featherstone Rovers players
Living people
Rugby league centres
English rugby league players
Widnes Vikings players
Year of birth missing (living people)